Mecyclothorax unctus is a species of ground beetle in the subfamily Psydrinae. It was described by Blackburn in 1881.

References

unctus
Beetles described in 1881